Frailty is the debut studio album by Dltzk (stylized in all lowercase), which is a formerly used pseudonym of American digicore musician Jane Remover. The album was released via deadAir on November 12, 2021. About the album, Remover stated, "I'm finally making the music I've wanted to make since I was 9".

Music
Frailty has been described as being, or influenced by, digicore, indie rock, hyperpop, emo, emo-electronic, EDM, and dariacore (a microgenre invented by Remover).

Frailty sound was partly inspired by the soundtracks of video games Pokémon Diamond and Pearl, Pokémon Black and White, and Undertale. Remover was also influenced by artists such as Skrillex and Porter Robinson. Remover stated that their "biggest inspirations as of today are my friends". As Grant Sharples of Paste explains, Remover's influences are "scattered throughout, but [the album] remains Remover's show first and foremost".

Artwork
The album's artwork features a grainy and JPEG distorted photo of a house with two people sitting and a parked car in front. It is a screenshot taken from Google Maps while Remover was making the album. The house is located in Wakita, Oklahoma.

Promotion
Remover teased the album's release through a series of videos posted on Twitter labelled as "Frailty Broadcasts". On September 19, 2021, the first teaser video, titled "F⓹y Emergency Alert Details", was released. Like the five that follow, the video consists of grainy and JPEG distorted footage from various sources, and a snippet of a song from the album, typically in lower quality than the studio version. The videos were released on scattered dates ranging from September 19 to November 11, 2021.

On September 26, 2021, Remover's birthday, they revealed the album's release date, cover art, and track listing through a tweet.

Critical reception

Frailty received critical acclaim. Mano Sundaresan of Pitchfork praised the album for its "adventurous" blend of genres, and wrote that the album's "tracks blur together with seamless transitions." Grant Sharples of Paste also praised the blend of influences and styles. He stated "Frailty is a testament to the power of genre and how everything we consume inevitably infiltrates our psyche." Online music critic Anthony Fantano referred to the album as "consistently creative and impressive."

Frailty was ranked at 47 on Pitchforks list of the best albums of 2021 and placed on their list of 2021's best progressive pop music. It also placed on Paste's list of the year's 30 best debut albums.

Track listing

 All tracks are stylized in all lowercase.

References and notes

Notes

References

External links
 Frailty on Bandcamp

Hyperpop albums
Electronic albums by American artists
2021 debut albums